The Ministry of Health (Portuguese: Ministério da Juventude e Desportos), is an Angolan government ministry.

External links
Official website 

Angola
Youth and Sports